Matt Goggin (21 July 1936 – 2 February 1972) was  a former Australian rules footballer who played with Geelong in the Victorian Football League (VFL).		
		
The older brother of Geelong captain Bill Goggin, Matt was electrocuted and killed in a workplace accident in February 1972 whilst working as a linesman for the State Electricity Commission of Victoria.

Notes

External links 
		

1936 births
1972 deaths
Accidental deaths by electrocution
Australian rules footballers from Victoria (Australia)
Geelong Football Club players
Accidental deaths in Victoria (Australia)
Industrial accident deaths
People from Melton, Victoria